Walnut Grove Township, Illinois may refer to one of the following townships:

 Walnut Grove Township, Knox County, Illinois
 Walnut Grove Township, McDonough County, Illinois

See also

Walnut Grove Township (disambiguation)

Illinois township disambiguation pages